Novoye Ratovo is a rural locality (a village) in Kovarditskoye Rural Settlement, Muromsky District, Vladimir Oblast, Russia. The population was 26 as of 2010.

Geography 
Novoye Ratovo is located 15 km southwest of Murom (the district's administrative centre) by road. Maksimovka is the nearest rural locality.

References 

Rural localities in Muromsky District